The following is a list of the most populous Peruvian metropolitan areas with over 300,000 inhabitants.

Note that the populations of metropolitan areas are not city populations but rather a combination of a main large city and many other smaller satellite cities.
In Peru, cities with a population of more than 500,000 and with a metropolitan development plan are considered metropolises. As of the 2007 census, these cities are Lima, Arequipa, and Trujillo.

Composition

 Lima metropolitan area

Lima metropolitan area is composed of 5 sub regions that group 43 urban districts of Lima Province and 6 districts of Callao Province. These sub regions are the Lima Norte, Lima Sur, Lima Este, Central Lima, and Callao with a total estimated population in 2015 of  9.886.647 people.

Arequipa Metropolitan Area

Trujillo Metropolitan Area

Chiclayo Metropolitan Area

Piura: Piura, Castilla, Catacaos.

Iquitos: Iquitos, Punchana, San Juan Bautista, Belén.

Cusco: San Jerónimo, Cusco, Santiago, Wanchaq, San Sebastián.

Chimbote: Chimbote, Nuevo Chimbote y Coishco.

Huancayo: Huancayo, El Tambo, Chilca.

See also

List of cities in Peru
List of regions by population of Peru
Peru

References

 
Populated places in Peru
Metropolitan
Peru